Serang is a city in Indonesia.

Serang may also refer to:
Serang Regency, a regency within Banten Province of Indonesia, and surrounding both Serang city and Cilegon city on their landward sides.
Seram Island, in Indonesia
Serang River, a river on Java
The boatswain or senior engine room rating of a lascar ship's crew

See also
Sarang (disambiguation)